The Good Bean is a snack food company founded by Sarah Wallace and Suzanne Slatcher in 2010, and based in Berkeley, California, USA, specializing in chickpea-based snacks. Its Roasted Chickpea Snacks are "Desi" variety chickpeas, dry roasted and tossed in spices. The Fruit & No-Nut Bar is a nut-free variation of the fruit and nut energy bar.

Acquisitions 
In December 2019, The Good Bean, Inc. announced its acquisition of Beanito's brand of plant-based, protein rich bean snacks. Beanito's is best known for its bean chips and vegetable chips.

Products
Launched in 2010, The Good Bean Roasted Chickpea Snacks are available in the following flavors:
 Sea salt
 Cracked pepper
 Smoky chili and lime
 Sweet cinnamon
 Mesquite BBQ

Launched in 2012, The Good Bean Fruit & No-Nut Bars are available in the following flavors:
 Chocolate berry
 Apricot and coconut
 Fruit and seeds trail mix

Awards
 Graphic Design USA - "2011 American Graphic Design Awards" for Roasted Chickpea Snack package design
 Graphic Design USA - "2012 American Graphic Design Awards" for Fruit & No-Nut Bar package design
 Daily Candy – "Best Snacks Roundup 2012"

References

External links
 The Good Bean

Brand name snack foods
Food and drink companies established in 2010
American companies established in 2010
Companies based in Berkeley, California
Food and drink in the San Francisco Bay Area
2010 establishments in California
Food and drink companies based in California